Starbreaker is the self-titled debut album of the Tony Harnell-led heavy metal band Starbreaker, released on July 13, 2005, while Harnell was still in TNT.

Track listing
 "Die for You" - 4:31
 "Lies" - 5:25
 "Break My Bones" - 4:25
 "Crushed" - 4:36
 "Days of Confusion" - 4:23
 "Transparent" - 4:34
 "Light at the End of the World" - 3:59
 "Cradle to the Grave" - 3:54
 "Underneath a Falling Sky" - 4:26
 "Turn It Off" - 4:09
 "Dragonfly" [Instrumental] - 4:09
 "Save Yourself" - 3:52
 "Days of Confusion" [Acoustic] - 3:44

Personnel
 Tony Harnell – lead vocals
 Magnus Karlsson – guitars, keyboards
 Fabrizio Grossi – bass
 John Macaluso – drums, percussion

2005 albums
Starbreaker (band) albums
Frontiers Records albums